Valencia Football Club is a professional football club based in Léogâne, Haiti. The club plays in Haiti's top national league, the Ligue Haïtienne.

History
Valencia FC was founded on 27 June 1972. The club won its first national championship in 2012.

Following their league success in 2012, Valencia would make their first appearance in the regional championship, the CONCACAF Champions League (CCL), in 2013, finishing atop their qualification group on April 30, 2013 after a 0–0 draw with Boys' Town F.C. of Jamaica. Valencia would go on to face Cruz Azul of Mexico and C.S. Herediano of Costa Rica in the group stage.

Honours
Ligue Haïtienne: 1
 2012

International competitions
CONCACAF Champions League: 1 appearance
2013–14 – Group 1 – Lost against  Cruz Azul (1–2), &  Herediano (1–6)

CFU Club Championship: 1 appearance
2013 – Won Group 2 – Won against  Bayamón (1–3), won against  Portmore United (3–4), draw against  Boys' Town; qualified directly to the 2013–14 CONCACAF Champions League
2014 – Bye to Finals, Finals cancelled, did not qualify for 2014–15 CONCACAF Champions League

Crests

Players

References

External links
Fédération Haïtienne de Football
footballdatabase.eu
Valencia FC at National-Football-Teams.com

Football clubs in Haiti
Association football clubs established in 1972
1972 establishments in Haiti
Léogâne